Charles Sherman may refer to:

 Charles Taylor Sherman (1811–1879), Ohio lawyer and judge
 Charles "Cy" Sherman, American journalist, known as the "father of the Cornhuskers"
 Charles Robert Sherman (1788–1829), American lawyer and public servant
 Charles Sherman (artist) (born 1947), American artist
 Charles Phineas Sherman (1874–1962), professor of Roman law and canon law